The Museé alsacien (Alsatian museum) is one of the three museums of Haguenau, France. Like its older and much larger counterpart in Strasbourg, it is dedicated to local, mostly rural customs, furniture, and folk art.

The museum was established in 1972 when the ethnographic collection of the Musée historique de Haguenau was separated from the rest of the collections in order to reorganise the existing space. It was moved into the former chancery, a late 15th-century building.

Building 
The museum has been installed since 1972 in the old medieval chancellery, which was built around 1486 and had this function until 1790. The building was partially restored during the 19th century.

The burgundy facade is of great architectural interest. The arms and the seal of the city, the coat of arms of the Empire and the coats of arms of patricians and notables of the city are symbolized on the facade.

Manufactured in 1904 by the firm Hörz and remained in the city's historical museum until 1958, the astronomical clock is a replica of that of Ulm's Town Hall made in the 16th century by Isaac Habrecht. The clock has an astrolabe and a planetary, which reproduces the movements of the stars and stars around the sun; the dial has a diameter of 2.76 meters.

Collection 
The collections are spread over two floors, in addition to the ground floor, which is mainly devoted to reception. It have Alsatian costumes worn from the 17th century, paintings under glass, religious or popular images, canivets, regional furniture and ceramics as well as the reconstruction of a traditional interior.

Gallery

References

External links 

Website of the Musée alsacien

Museum
Museums in Bas-Rhin
Ethnographic museums in France
Museums established in 1972
1972 establishments in France